Thomas Hampson (born 1955) is an American baritone opera singer.

Thomas Hampson may also refer to:
Sir Thomas Hampson, 1st Baronet (c. 1589–1655), of the Hampson baronets
Sir Thomas Hampson, 2nd Baronet (c. 1626–1670), of the Hampson baronets
Thomas Hampson (author) (1839–1918), English author and local historian
Tommy Hampson (footballer) (1898–?), English footballer
Tommy Hampson (1907–1965), British track and field athlete

See also
Hampson (surname)